Markus Johansson (born December 22, 1984) is an American heavy metal guitarist and vocalist from Chicago, Illinois. He is currently the lead guitarist for the international touring band, THEM. Johansson is also the lead vocalist and guitarist for Sylencer, Australian thrash metal band, 4ARM, as well as a session guitarist for various projects.

Biography

Early years
Johansson is a self-taught lead guitarist from Chicago, Illinois, who began playing guitar when he was 13 years old. At the age of 17, Markus auditioned for Limp Bizkit, to which Fred Durst humorously told him to "go play for Megadeth, instead." In 2009, Markus auditioned with Dying Fetus, but continued on as the lead vocalist and lead guitarist of the band Sylencer.

Recent events

2004-2012

In the summer of 2004, Johansson founded the band Sylencer and began recording their debut album, "A Lethal Dose of Truth" in 2006. He recruited drummer Kevin Talley and guitarist Larry Tarnowski to round out the lineup for his debut release. The majority of the album was recorded by the end of 2006, Johansson recruited several big names in the heavy metal community which grew to include members of Dream Theater, Anthrax, Dethklok, and nearly a dozen others. A Lethal Dose of Truth was released independently in September 2012 through Sylencer Records.

2013-2016

In the spring of 2014, Johansson collaborated with guitarist Toby Knapp on the instrumental album Unborn Spirits Immortal. The album was released in June 2014 through Shred Guy records. That same year, Markus joined Australian metal band, 4ARM as their lead singer/guitarist and recorded their 2015 album, Survivalist. Currently, Markus is the lead guitarist for the heavy metal band THEM and recorded on their 2016 album, Fear Them. He joined their spring tour which headlined Helloween.

2017-2018

Johansson did several tours with THEM.

 Harder than Steel (9/30/17)
 Mountains of Madness (10/20/17)
 German Swordbrothers Festival (2/14/18)
 Metalheadz Open Air 2018 (5/11/18)

On May 23, 2018 Johansson joined Repentance and opened for Trivium

2019-2020

Johansson spent the majority of 2019 and 2020 working on his studio tan and on the debut Repentance album "God For A Day," and THEM's "Return to Hemmersmoor," in addition to several other session projects. He did a short European tour with THEM in spring of 2019.

2020-2021

In fall of 2020, Johansson joined Chicago's legendary 80's Hair Metal tribute, Hairbangers Ball as "Darrell Diamond." During the COVID-19 pandemic downtime, the group collaborated and released an original single "All Aboard the Bang Train" - a song about the famous Bluebird Nightclub in Bloomington, Indiana. Also, Johnasson, in addition to other former members of Repentance, to form a new project, Divinity Plague.

Equipment
ESP Guitars, ISP Technologies, FU-Tone, BTPA, Rocktron, Fastback Custom, Cleartone Guitar Strings, Protone Pedals, Two Notes Audio Engineering.

Johannson has his own custom pickup, The Cobra Igniter.

Bands
 Sylencer 2006–present
 4ARM 2013–present
 THEM 2015–present
 Repentance 2018-2021
 Hairbangers Ball 2020–2022
 Divinity Plague 2021–present

Discography

Sylencer
 A Lethal Dose of Truth (2012)

THEM
 "Fear Them" (2016)
 "Sweet Hollow" (2016) 
 "Manor of the Seven Gables" (2018)
 "Back in the Garden Where Death Sleeps" (2019)
 "Return to Hemmersmoor" (2020)
 "Fear City" (2022)

Knapp/Johansson
 "Unborn Spirits Immortal" (2014)
 "Electric Gathering" (2015)

4ARM
 "Survivalist" (2015)
 Pathway to Oblivion (2023)

Repentance
 "God For A Day" (2020)

Evan K
 Blue Lightning (2016), Guest vocals on 'Everything Is Coming Up Roses

Hairbangers Ball
 "All Aboard the Bang Train" (single) (2021)
 "Play Dangerous" (single) (2021)

References

External links
Official Website

American heavy metal guitarists
Seven-string guitarists
1984 births
Living people
21st-century American guitarists